Ireen Lungu (born 6 October 1997) is a Zambian footballer who plays as a midfielder for BIIK Shymkent and the Zambia women's national team.

International career
Lungu represented Zambia at the 2018 Africa Women Cup of Nations.

International goals
Scores and results list Zambia's goal tally first

References

1997 births
Living people
Zambian women's footballers
Zambia women's international footballers
Women's association football midfielders
Footballers at the 2020 Summer Olympics
Olympic footballers of Zambia